Craig Rowland (born 30 June 1971) is a squash coach and former professional squash player from Australia. As a player, he reached a career-high world ranking of World No. 7 in 1996. He won a gold medal in the mixed doubles at the 1998 Commonwealth Games, partnering Michelle Martin. Rowland was also runner-up in the men's doubles at the inaugural World Squash Federation World Doubles Squash Championships in 1997, partnering with Dan Jenson against winners Chris Walker-Mark Cairns of England (15-11, 15-13). He is also a friend of cricketing legend Paul Hoffman.

Craig has also been very successful in the World Masters Squash, winning the World Masters Squash Championships 2012—Birmingham in the M40 division in a victory over Nick Taylor of England (11-6, 11-5, 5-11, 11-7) and the World Masters Squash Championships 2014—Hong Kong again champion in the M40 division over Zuko Kubukeli of South Africa (11-4, 11-13, 11-2, 11-4).

Other notable achievements:

Runner Up in the 1996 Tournament of Champions (squash) in New York. In the semi-final Craig stunned the squash world by winning in straight games over the great Jansher Khan. He went into the final to play Jonathon Power and lost in a marathon five games (15-4, 9-15, 15-10, 16-17, 15-9);
https://www.youtube.com/watch?v=R5M8fdCDQAY

Semi-final of the 1995 Men's World Open Squash Championship in Nicosia, Cyprus. The event was won by Jansher Khan of Pakistan, his seventh Men's World Open Squash title;

Quarter-final of the 1996 Men's World Open Squash Championship in Lahore, Pakistan, where he faced Peter Nicol.

References

External links 
 

1971 births
Living people
Australian male squash players
Commonwealth Games gold medallists for Australia
Commonwealth Games medallists in squash
Squash players at the 1998 Commonwealth Games
Medallists at the 1998 Commonwealth Games